Kengo Hirachi (平地 健吾 Hirachi Kengo, born 30 November 1964) is a Japanese mathematician, specializing in CR geometry and mathematical analysis.

Hirachi received from Osaka University his B.S. in 1987, his M.S. in 1989, and his Dr.Sci., advised by Gen Komatsu, in 1994 with dissertation The second variation of the Bergman kernel for ellipsoids. He was a research assistant from 1989 to 1996 and a lecturer from 1996 to 2000 at Osaka University. He was an associate professor from 2000 to 2010 and a full professor from 2010 to the present at the University of Tokyo. He was a visiting professor at the Mathematical Sciences Research Institute from October 1995 to September 1996, at the Erwin Schrödinger Institute for Mathematical Physics from March 2004 to April 2004, at Princeton University from October 2004 to July 2005, and at the Institute for Advanced Study from January 2009 to April 2009.

Awards and honors
Takebe Senior Prize (1999) of the Mathematical Society of Japan
Geometry Prize (2003) of the Mathematical Society of Japan
Stefan Bergman Prize (2006)
Inoue Prize for Science (2012) 
Invited lecture at ICM, Seoul 2014

References

External links
Kengo Hirachi -- Bibliography, U. of Tokyo website
ICM2014 VideoSeries IL8.3 : Kengo Hirachi on Aug14Thu - YouTube

1964 births
Living people
20th-century Japanese mathematicians
21st-century Japanese mathematicians
Osaka University alumni
Academic staff of the University of Tokyo
Complex analysts
Mathematical analysts
PDE theorists